The Rally of Poland (in Polish, Rajd Polski) is a motorsport event for rally cars that was first established in 1921. It is third-oldest rally in the world, preceded only by Österreichische Alpenfahrt and Monte Carlo Rally. The event became a permanent fixture of the European Rally Championship in 1960, except for a few editions held as part of the World Rally Championship.

In 1973, the Rally of Poland was the one of the thirteen rounds of newly established World Rally Championship, but was removed from the 1974 calendar. After a move to Mikołajki in the Masurian Lake District in 2005, event organisers started lobbying for the event's inclusion as a round of the World Rally Championship. After being run as a candidate event in 2007 and 2008, Poland returned to the World Rally Championship in 2009, which was won by Mikko Hirvonen. However, the event was once again removed from the WRC after a single season, and was replaced by Rally Bulgaria.

During the 2012 season, the FIA put forward a tender for new events, and after a delay of one year, considered events in Brazil, China, India, Russia, South Africa and Poland for inclusion on the 2014 season calendar. The Rally of Poland was the successful candidate, and returned to the championship in 2014. The proposed route featured stages in nearby Lithuania, in a format similar to the Rally of Sweden, which crosses over the border into Norway. It was removed from the calendar after the 2017 season after the FIA repeatedly raised concerns about the event's safety.

Rally winners

† — Rally was part of the World Rally Championship.

Multiple winners

References

External links
 Official website
 Rajd Polski at eWRC-results

 
Poland
Recurring sporting events established in 1921
Poland